Liceales (also Liceida) is an order of Amoebozoa.

References

Amoebozoa orders
Myxogastria